The Engelberg is a hill of Hesse, Germany.

References

Hills of Hesse